Hugh Dickson (born 28 August 1981) is a Northern Irish former professional footballer who played as a defender.

Career
Dickson started his career with Northern Irish side Glentoran, helping them win the 1999–2000 Irish Cup. In 2000, Dickson signed for Wigan in the English third tier, where he made 4 appearances and scored 0 goals. On 19 December 2000, he debuted for Wigan during a 1–2 loss to Notts County. Before the second half of 2001–02, Dickson signed for Northern Irish club Ards. In 2002, he signed for Linfield in the Northern Irish top flight.

In 2003, he signed for Scottish fourth tier team Elgin City. Before the second half of 2007–08, Dickson signed for Glenavon in the Northern Irish top flight, where he suffered a fractured skull. In 2010, he signed for Northern Irish fourth tier outfit Killyleagh.

References

External links
 

Living people
1982 births
Association footballers from Northern Ireland
Association football defenders
Northern Ireland youth international footballers
NIFL Premiership players
English Football League players
Scottish Professional Football League players
Glentoran F.C. players
Wigan Athletic F.C. players
Ards F.C. players
Linfield F.C. players
Elgin City F.C. players
Glenavon F.C. players
Expatriate association footballers from Northern Ireland
Expatriate footballers in England
Expatriate footballers in Scotland